Blame It on Gravity is the seventh studio album by American country/rock band Old 97's, released on May 13, 2008. It entered the Billboard 200 album charts at #85. The album was produced by Salim Nourallah.

Reception 
The album was met with critical acclaim. Robert Christgau gave the album an A−, and on the NPR radio show All Things Considered said, "[Old 97's] just put out their best album in seven years. Blame It On Gravity is noticeably more taut and focused than their earlier albums--more delicate, too."

Track listing

Personnel
Old 97's
Rhett Miller - vocals, guitars
Murry Hammond - bass, guitars, vocals, keyboards
Ken Bethea - guitars, vocals
Philip Peeples - drums

Additional musicians
Rip Rowan - keyboards
Salim Nourallah - keyboards, guitars
Ward Williams - pedal steel

References

Old 97's albums
2008 albums
New West Records albums